This is a list of Danish television related events from 2015.

Events
7 February - Anti Social Media are selected to represent Denmark at the 2015 Eurovision Song Contest with their song "The Way You Are". They are selected to be the forty-third Danish Eurovision entry during Dansk Melodi Grand Prix held at the Gigantium in Aalborg.
7 March - 17-year-old beatboxer Thor "Thorsen" Mikkelsen wins the first season of Danmark har talent.
27 March - 15-year-old Emilie Esther wins the eighth season of X Factor.
31 October - 11-year-old Isabel wins the third season of Voice Junior.
27 November - Badehotellet actress Ena Spottag and her partner Thomas Evers Poulsen win the twelfth season of Vild med dans.

Debuts

Television shows

1990s
Hvem vil være millionær? (1999–present)

2000s
Vild med dans (2005–present)
X Factor (2008–present)

2010s
Voice – Danmarks største stemme (2011–present)
Danmark har talent (2014–present)

Ending this year

Births

Deaths

See also
 2015 in Denmark